Otay Ranch High School is a high school located in Chula Vista, California. Otay Ranch High School primarily serves the Chula Vista developments of Otay Ranch and Rancho Del Rey.

History
Otay Ranch High School (ORHS) was built in 2003 as a part of the Sweetwater Union High School District and first opened to 9th and 10th graders and later accommodated 11th and 12th graders. Otay Ranch High School originally opened to relieve overcrowding from surrounding schools such as San Ysidro High School and Eastlake High School. It serves students living in both the Otay Ranch and Rancho del Rey developments.

Demographics
The demographic breakdown of the 2,789 students enrolled for the 2012-2013 school year was:
Native American/Alaskan - 0.2%
Asian/Pacific islander - 22.3%
Black - 4.7%
Hispanic - 60.2%
White - 8.4%
Multiracial - 4.2%

In addition, 22.7% of the students were eligible for free or reduced lunch.

The demographic breakdown of the 2,372 students enrolled for the 2018-2019 school year was:
Male - 49.2%
Female - 50.8%
American Indian/Alaska Native - <0.1%
Asian - 22.5%
Black - 4.6%
Hispanic - 59.7%
Native Hawaiian/Pacific Islander - 0.3%
White - 5.9%
Multiracial - 8.0%

In addition, 33.6% of the students were eligible for free or reduced lunch.

Performing arts
Otay Ranch has a competitive show choir, "Full Effect".

Notable alumni
 Luis Perez, XFL quarterback
  Devin Lloyd, NFL Linebacker

References

External links
Official website

Educational institutions established in 2003
High schools in San Diego County, California
Public high schools in California
2003 establishments in California
Education in Chula Vista, California